Charlie Is My Darling may refer to:

Charlie Is My Darling (film), a 1966 film about The Rolling Stones
"Charlie Is My Darling" (song), one of several traditional Scots songs